On 26 June 1964, Swiss Post introduced postal codes as the third country after Germany (1941) and the United States (1963).

In Switzerland, the postal codes have four digits. As with the postcode system introduced in Germany in 1993, a municipality can receive several postcodes. A locality (settlement) having its own postal code does not mean that it is an independent political municipality, but only that it is an official locality. In addition, a postcode can include several political communes (e.g.: 3048 Worblaufen, includes parts of the communes of Bern and Ittigen) or several cantons (e.g.: 8866 Ziegelbrücke, includes parts of the cantons of Glarus and St. Gallen), which is why it is not possible to assign it unambiguously in both directions. In addition, it is often not possible to assign a unique postcode to post offices (post boxes) in larger cities. For this reason, six-digit postcodes are used internally.

The Principality of Liechtenstein is also included in the Swiss postal code system, as is the German enclave of Büsingen am Hochrhein, which has its own Swiss postal codes in addition to its national one, DE-78266. Before January 2020, the Italian enclave of Campione d'Italia also had a Swiss postcode, CH-6911, but this ceased to be valid, and all mail requires the use of the Italian postcode IT-22061. This followed the enclave's entry into the European Union's Customs Area. Also in Italy, Swiss Post previously held an office in Domodossola with the code CH-3907. This is now used for the village of Simplon.

Format of postal codes (PLZ/NPA)
The Swiss postal codes are assigned geographically, from west to east. They don't follow political divisions (cantons, districts), but they follow a routing allocation, following railways and PostBus routes. The postal code of big cities finish with 00, and it is not allocated if in the region there isn't a big center.

Switzerland is divided into nine postal districts, numbered from west to east. Each district is subdivided into postal areas.
Each area contains a maximum of one hundred units.

The postal codes are made up as follows:
3436 Zollbrück
3 = district (Bern)
34 = area (Burgdorf)
343 = route (Burgdorf - Langnau)
3436 = post office number (Zollbrück)

Today, the third digit has no real meaning anymore. In the past, mail was assigned to fixed railway or truck routes, but modern logistics do not need this practice any more.

Postal codes of Liechtenstein are included in the same structure, using the range from 9480 to 9499.

Summary of postal codes

1xxx - Region Western Switzerland (South)
10xx - Region Lausanne, Echallens (North-West)
11xx - Region Morges, Rolle
12xx - Canton of Geneva and Region Nyon
13xx - Region between Lausanne and Yverdon, Jura side (Cossonay, Orbe, Vallorbe)
14xx - Yverdon, Estavayer-le-Lac (VD/FR)
15xx - Moudon, Lucens, Avenches (VD/FR)
16xx - Romont, Bulle (VD/FR)
17xx - Region Fribourg to Lake Murten (Münchenwiler)
18xx - Eastern shore of Lake Geneva (Vevey, Montreux), Chablais (Aigle, Monthey, St. Maurice VD/VS)
19xx - Lower Valais (Martigny, Sion) without Region Sierre
2xxx - Region Western Switzerland (North)
20xx - Region Neuchâtel
21xx - Val de Travers NE, Boudry
22xx - Upper Val-de-Ruz,
23xx - La Chaux-de-Fonds, Franches-Montagnes, Val-de-Ruz
24xx - Le Locle, La Sagne
25xx - Region Biel/Bienne, Lake Biel, Grenchen, Courtelary
26xx - Vallon de St. Imier
27xx - Bernese Jura (Tavannes, Tramelan, Moutier, Franches Montagnes)
28xx - Delémont
29xx - Ajoie (Porrentruy)
3xxx - Region Bern/Upper Valais
30xx - City of Bern and agglomeration
31xx - Southern agglomeration of Bern
32xx - Seeland (Aarberg, Ins, Kerzers, Lyss)
33xx - Region between Bern and Solothurn
34xx - Region Burgdorf, Oberaargau (except Langenthal)
35xx - Emmental
36xx - Region Thun
37xx - Region Spiez, Simmental
38xx - Region Interlaken, Haslital
39xx - Upper Valais with region Sierre, Crans Montana
4xxx - Region Basel
40xx - City of Basel
41xx - Leimental, Birstal, Riehen, Bettingen, Pratteln
42xx - Laufental, Schwarzbubenland
43xx - Western Fricktal (Rheinfelden, Stein AG)
44xx - Basel-Country
45xx - Region Solothurn
46xx - Region Olten
47xx - Region Oensingen, Balsthal
48xx - Region Zofingen
49xx - Region Langenthal
5xxx - Region Aarau
50xx - City of Aarau and Region, eastern Fricktal (Frick, Laufenburg)
51xx - Region Wildegg, Schinznach
52xx - Region Brugg, Mettauertal
53xx - Region Turgi to Koblenz
54xx - Region Baden, Wettingen
55xx - Region Mellingen
56xx - Region Lenzburg, Wohlen, Bremgarten, Muri (Freiamt)
57xx - Region Kulm, Beinwil, Kölliken, Safenwil
6xxx - Region Central Switzerland (Innerschweiz), Tessin
60xx - Region Lucerne, Obwalden
61xx - Entlebuch, Willisau
62xx - Region Sempach, Sursee, Hochdorf
63xx - Canton of Zug, Nidwalden
64xx - Canton of Schwyz (except Ausserschwyz), Canton of Uri
65xx - Region Bellinzona, Misox, Val Calanca (GR)
66xx - Locarno, Valle Maggia, Val Verzasca
67xx - Leventina, Val Blenio
68xx - Mendrisotto
69xx - Region Lugano
7xxx - Region Graubünden
70xx - Chur, Schanfigg (Arosa), Domat/Ems, Flims
71xx - Bündner Oberland
72xx - Prättigau, Davos
73xx - Bündner Herrschaft, Landquart, Sargans
74xx - Hinterrhein, Albula
75xx - Engadin, Val Müstair
76xx - Bergell
77xx - Poschiavo
8xxx - Region Zürich
80xx - City of Zurich 
81xx - Region Zürcher Unterland
82xx - Region Schaffhausen, Kreuzlingen, Büsingen am Hochrhein (German enclave)
83xx - Kloten, Zürcher Oberland, Hinwil, Hinterthurgau
84xx - Region Winterthur, Tösstal
85xx - Region Frauenfeld, Weinfelden, Amriswil, Romanshorn
86xx - Region Dübendorf, Zürcher Oberland, See (SG)
87xx - Region Right shore of Lake Zurich, Gaster/See (SG), Canton Glarus
88xx - Region Linkes Zürichseeufer, Ausserschwyz (March, Höfe, Einsiedeln SZ), Glarner Unterland, Sarganserland/Lake Walen
89xx - Region Limmattal, Albis, Knonauer Amt, Mutschellen and Kelleramt (easternmost Aargau)
9xxx - Region Eastern Switzerland (Ostschweiz)
90xx - Region St. Gallen, Appenzell
91xx - Region Herisau
92xx - Region Gossau, Flawil, Uzwil, Bischofszell
93xx - Region Arbon
94xx - Region Rorschach, Rheintal, Liechtenstein
95xx - Region Wil
96xx - Toggenburg

Cities
1211: Geneva (generic post code for all P.O. Box addresses in Geneva; the address is followed by a number indicating the exact post office in which the box is located, e.g. 1211 Geneva 7: 1 Mont-Blanc, 10 United Nations, 11 Rue du Stand, 12 Champel, 13 Les Charmilles, 14 State Hospital, 16 Grand-Pré, 17 Malagnou, 18 St-Jean, 19 Petit-Saconnex, 2 Cornavin/Swisscom, 20 CIC, 21 Les Pâquis, 22 International Labour Organization, 23 CERN, 24 Les Acacias, 26 La Praille/Military base, 27 World Health Organization, 28 Le Bouchet, 3 Rive, 4 Plainpalais, 5 Main Post Office, 6 Les Eaux-Vives, 7 Servette, 70 CS, 8 Jonction, 84 Voting system, 9 La Cluse)
80xx: The city districts of Zurich were numbered before the Swiss postal codes were introduced; the number of the city district equals the last numbers of the postal code. The administration of the canton of Zurich has the postal code 8090.
3003 is the postal code of the Federal administration which is located in Bern.

Liechtenstein
9485: Nendeln
9486: Schaanwald
9487: Gamprin
9488: Schellenberg
9489: Schaan 
9490: Vaduz
9491: Ruggell
9492: Eschen
9493: Mauren
9494: Schaan
9495: Triesen
9496: Balzers
9497: Triesenberg
9498: Planken
9499: omitted

Notes and references

See also
Swiss Post

External links
Postcode directory for Switzerland and the Principality of Liechtenstein
Switzerland Postal Codes (in German)
Switzerland & Liechtenstein Postal Codes in XML, CSV, JSON format (in German)

Communications in Switzerland
Communications in Liechtenstein
Postal codes
Postal codes

Switzerland
Liechtenstein–Switzerland relations